New Era is a village in Shelby Township, Oceana County in the U.S. state of Michigan. The population was 451 at the 2010 census.

New Era is the birthplace of Caldecott Medal-winning children's author Verna Aardema. The village is near the halfway point on the Hart-Montague Trail, and local businesses woo visiting cyclists as they pass by along the trail. New Era is also home to dairy product manufacturer, Country Dairy. YouTube personality Houston Jones of the series Bodybuilder Versus and Bro Labs, resides in New Era.

Geography

Demographics

2010 census
As of the census of 2010, there were 451 people, 173 households, and 129 families residing in the village. The racial makeup of the village was 96.2% White, 0.2% African American, 1.6% Native American, 0.4% Asian, 0.7% from other races, and 0.9% from two or more races. Hispanic or Latino of any race were 3.1% of the population.

There were 173 households, of which 32.9% had children under the age of 18 living with them, 65.3% were married couples living together, 7.5% had a female householder with no husband present, 1.7% had a male householder with no wife present, and 25.4% were non-families. 22.5% of all households were made up of individuals, and 9.2% had someone living alone who was 65 years of age or older. The average household size was 2.61 and the average family size was 3.06.

The median age in the village was 41.9 years. 27.1% of residents were under the age of 18; 7% were between the ages of 18 and 24; 20.4% were from 25 to 44; 27.7% were from 45 to 64; and 17.7% were 65 years of age or older. The gender makeup of the village was 50.1% male and 49.9% female.

2000 census
As of the census of 2000, there were 461 people, 162 households, and 132 families residing in the village. The racial makeup of the village was 95.66% White, 0.22% Native American, 0.22% Asian, 1.52% from other races, and 2.39% from two or more races. Hispanic or Latino of any race were 4.34% of the population.

There were 162 households, out of which 37.7% had children under the age of 18 living with them, 71.6% were married couples living together, 7.4% had a female householder with no husband present, and 18.5% were non-families. 16.7% of all households were made up of individuals, and 10.5% had someone living alone who was 65 years of age or older.  The average household size was 2.81 and the average family size was 3.20.

In the village, the population was spread out, with 29.9% under the age of 18, 6.9% from 18 to 24, 24.3% from 25 to 44, 24.1% from 45 to 64, and 14.8% who were 65 years of age or older.  The median age was 37 years. For every 100 females, there were 99.6 males.  For every 100 females age 18 and over, there were 92.3 males.

The median income for a household in the village was $45,909, and the median income for a family was $50,000. Males had a median income of $37,063 versus $25,000 for females. The per capita income for the village was $18,417.  About 0.7% of families and 2.8% of the population were below the poverty line, including 4.1% of those under age 18 and 5.6% of those age 65 or over.

References

External links
Official website

Villages in Oceana County, Michigan
Villages in Michigan